Leipzig Olbrichtstraße station is a railway station in Leipzig, Saxony, Germany, located near Olbrichtstraße.

References

External links
 

Olbrichtstraße
Olbrichtstraße